Mimela macleayana, is a species of true dung beetle found in India and Sri Lanka.

Description
Head, pronotum and scutellum are golden green in color. Elytra green with yellowish outer margins. Body is large, and elongate-oval. Legs, pygidium and ventrum covered with decumbent hairs. Eyes are prominent but with a small clypeus which is coarsely rugose. Forehead strongly punctured. Pronotum punctured and scutellum long and covered with few fine punctures. There are no lateral tooth in tibia of first leg pair.

References 

Scarabaeinae
Insects of Sri Lanka
Insects of India
Insects described in 1825